Robert Abercromby may refer to:
Robert Abercromby (Jesuit) (1536–1613), Scottish Jesuit missionary
Robert Abercromby (saddler), Scottish artisan serving James VI and I
Sir Robert Abercromby of Airthrey (1740–1827), general
Sir Robert Abercromby, 5th Baronet (1784–1855), British politician
Sir Robert John Abercromby, 7th Baronet (1850–1895)

See also
Robert Abercrombie Pringle (1855–1922), Canadian lawyer